Matrimonium is a 2005 comedy film directed by Michael Akers, his second feature film after the successful Gone, But Not Forgotten. Co-written and co-produced by him and Sandon Berg, the latter appears in a lead role in the film as Spencer who is having a sham same-sex marriage with the straight character Rick Federman in the role of Malcolm to enable the latter to win the 1-million dollar prize on the nationally broadcast reality television show Matrimonium.

The film was featured in Blood Moon's Guide to Gay & Lesbian Film, by Darwin Porter and Danforth Prince and published by Blood Moon Productions in 2006. In that book, Matrimonium is called a "hilarious spoof on reality television."

Synopsis
Malcolm Caufield (Rick Federman), a straight guy decides to go on a reality show called "Matrimonium" for a chance to win a million dollars. The sum comes handy after his allowance was cut off by his family. The reality show however has put a twist. Malcolm has to put a charade that he has suddenly turned "gay" and in a spoof arranged by the TV hostess (Deven Green), he is marrying the very gay Spencer Finch (Sandon Berg). All he has to do to win the prize is to convince his family (Bruce Cronander & Sondra Thieret) to attend the nationally televised same-sex wedding of their "now gay" son. Can Malcolm convince them and what are his true feelings towards his supposed TV scam partner and "lover"?

Cast
Rick Federman as Malcolm Caufield
Sandon Berg as Spencer Finch
Dotty Carey as Loretta Finch Hunt
Courtney Donnelly as Barbie Finch
Mandy Kaplan as Clarissa Cobb
Joel Bryant as Bradley DuBois
Bruce Cronander as Hugh Caufield
Sondra Thieret as Hugh's wife/Malcolm's mother
Deven Green as Andre Genous - hostess
Theron Hatch as Exotic male dancer

Screenings
The film showed at a number of film festivals as an official selection:
North Carolina International Film Festival
Philadelphia Gay & Lesbian Film Festival
Long Island Reeling LGBT Film Festival

References

External links
Matrimonium page on United Gay Network website

LGBT-related comedy films
2005 films
American LGBT-related films
Films directed by Michael Akers
2005 comedy films
2005 LGBT-related films
2000s English-language films
2000s American films